The Horton Light Railway had its origins in a contractor's line (the Ewell & Long Grove Railway) built in 1905 to transport building materials, coal and other supplies for London County Council's Epsom Cluster of psychiatric hospitals in the Horton area to the North-West of the town of Epsom. The Light Railway Order did not permit the carriage of passengers. The railway connected with the mainline network just south of Ewell West railway station.

Hospital construction
London County Council (LCC) bought the Horton Estate in November 1896 to build a cluster of new psychiatric hospitals. It was realised that getting the building materials to the sites from Epsom railway station would damage the roads, and so a light railway was proposed. After protracted negotiations the line received royal assent in August 1899. Meanwhile, contractors were charged a levy for loads, with a higher charge for traction engine than for horse and cart, but the traction engine was still favoured and road damage ensued. The railway was held back by the available budget, and by 1903 Manor Asylum, Horton Asylum, the associated power station and the Ewell Epileptic Colony (later known as St Ebba's) had all been completed. Work was about to begin on the large Long Grove Hospital, and the issue of road damage got worse. In 1904 LCC decided to issue an umbrella contract, and this enabled the contractor to lay a railway. When the contract was given to Foster & Dicksee of Rugby in October 1904, the way was clear to build the railway, which was to be known as the Ewell & Long Grove Railway.

Ewell & Long Grove Railway (1905-1907)
 
The required 41 acres (17 hectares) of land were bought in late 1904, and work started on the railway in January 1905. The connection and exchange sidings with the London and South Western Railway (L.S.W.R.) were completed in April 1905. Locomotive "Hollymoor" was delivered and using materials delivered by rail, and using a very large workforce the railway was completed by June 1905. As a freight only railway, light gauge rails and permanent way were adopted, and rather than have run round loops (except at the exchange sidings) the locomotives would propel the loaded wagons. With the completion of the railway a second locomotive arrived, No 947, and work commenced on Long Grove Asylum.

In 1906 a local woman, Mary Tobin, was run down and killed on a level crossing. The loco was propelling 12 trucks, and the lookout who should have been on the first truck, was on the fifth as the first four were sheeted over. The gates had been left open. Foster & Dicksee were found guilty of neglect. This resulted in a modification being made to the railway crossing gate, it also required a lookout to stand in the road with a red flag from that point onwards, and 4 mph limit on crossings, with the police to ensure the regulations were obeyed.

The Long Grove Asylum was completed on time and was opened in July 1907, after which the line was not used, and under the terms imposed by the local authority the lines were to be lifted at the three level crossings by 24 July 1908. Foster & Dicksee were in discussions with London County Council about retaining the line, but the local authority was not happy with Foster & Dicksee operating it, and eventually lifted the rails at the level crossings and sent Foster & Dicksee the bill.

Locomotives

The Horton Light Railway (1913-1950)
The construction of the fifth institution, "West Park" was planned in October 1908, but Foster & Dicksee was blocked by the local authority from operating the railway. The solution was that the railway was sold to London County Council so that they could built a permanent line allowing coal to be hauled to the power station at a considerable saving and benefit to the local roads. The line was sold to LCC "as is", and they inserted a clause in the General Powers Bill of 1909 allowing them to build the line, which included an extension to West Park, a siding to the power station, re-routing in various places, and the elimination of all level crossings by footbridges, and by a cutting under Hook Road. Work was delayed by budgetary constraints, but eventually started in early 1912. Other changes to the original contractor's railway included extra exchange sidings with a weighbridge, relocation of the engine shed nearer to the power station, and run-round loops just before each branch (as there was insufficient space at the end of the branches). The new light railway was completed in May 1913 (including removal of the remains of the Ewell & Long Grove Railway).

When war broke out, West Park had not been completed, and work on it was suspended. It was finally completed in 1921 along with the branch line serving it, complete with water tower and goods shed. West Park was officially opened in 1924.

The end of the 1920s was peak time for the railway, which moved 15,000 tons of coal and 4,000 tons of general goods per year. In the 1930s road transport was improving for general deliveries, and the connection of Epsom to the National Grid meant the power station which needed maintenance was no longer needed; it was closed down in 1935. The line survived during the Second World War, being used for a rail mounted anti-aircraft gun at one stage, but when the National Health Service was formed in 1948, it was clear it had outlived its use, and was badly in need of maintenance, so it was closed and the track lifted in 1950. The connection to the main line was removed in 1953.

Locomotives

Once or twice locomotives were borrowed from the LSWR (and later the Southern Railway) when the local engine was under repair.

The site today
The hospitals were shut down one by one, Long Grove closed in 1992, Manor Hospital was closed in 1994, Horton Hospital closed in 1997, West Park Hospital in 2002, St Ebba's Hospital is largely closed but retains a small therapy suite. Most of the buildings have either been demolished, or in some cases converted to modern accommodation. The trackbed is now used as a walking and riding path through Horton Country Park.

References

External links 
Details, map and photographs

Rail transport in Surrey
Railway lines opened in 1905
Hospital railways in the United Kingdom
Light railways
1905 establishments in England